DZLW (711 AM) Radyo Bicolandia is a radio station owned and operated by Peñafrancia Broadcasting Corporation. Its studios and transmitter are located Zone 1, Brgy. San Agustin, Canaman.

DZLW is an affiliate station of Eagle Broadcasting Corporation since 2015.

References

Radio stations in Naga, Camarines Sur
News and talk radio stations in the Philippines